Rowing competitions at the 2015 Pan American Games in Toronto  were held from July 11 to 15 at the Royal Canadian Henley Rowing Course in St. Catharines. A total of fourteen rowing events were contested at the Games. A total of fourteen rowing events were held: eight for men and six for women.

Competition schedule

The following is the competition schedule for the rowing competitions:

Medal table

Medalists

Men's events

Women's events

Participating nations
A total of 14 countries have qualified athletes. The number of athletes a nation has entered is in parentheses beside the name of the country.

Qualification

A total of 205 rowers qualified to compete at the games. A country may only enter a maximum of 26 rowers. All qualification was done at the 2014 Pan American Olympic Festival (except the men's eights which was by entry only), where a specific number of boats qualified in each of the fourteen events.

See also
Rowing at the 2016 Summer Olympics

References